Myo Min Tun (born 14 June 1983) is a footballer from Myanmar. He made his first appearance for the Myanmar national football team in 2004. Myo Min Tun retired in 2013 MNL season. In June 2016, he became a Yangon United manager.

International goals

References 

1986 births
Living people
Burmese footballers
Myanmar international footballers
Yangon United F.C. players
Association football midfielders
Southeast Asian Games silver medalists for Myanmar
Southeast Asian Games medalists in football
Competitors at the 2007 Southeast Asian Games